Middleton Airport may refer to:

 Middleton Field in Evergreen, Alabama;
 Middleton Municipal Airport in Middleton, Wisconsin.